The following is a list of the 257 communes of the Haute-Loire department of France.

The communes cooperate in the following intercommunalities (as of 2020):
Communauté d'agglomération du Puy-en-Velay
Communauté de communes Auzon Communauté
Communauté de communes Brioude Sud Auvergne
Communauté de communes du Haut-Lignon
Communauté de communes Loire et Semène
Communauté de communes Marches du Velay-Rochebaron
Communauté de communes Mézenc-Loire-Meygal
Communauté de communes des Pays de Cayres et de Pradelles
Communauté de communes du Pays de Montfaucon
Communauté de communes des Rives du Haut Allier
Communauté de communes des Sucs

References

Haute-Loire